Varavut Majchacheep (born June 8, 1973) is a Thai sport shooter. He competed in rifle shooting events at the 2000 Summer Olympics. He is the brother of Tevarit Majchacheep, who was also an Olympic shooter for Thailand.

Olympic results

References

1973 births
Living people
ISSF rifle shooters
Varavut Majchacheep
Varavut Majchacheep
Shooters at the 2000 Summer Olympics
Asian Games medalists in shooting
Varavut Majchacheep
Varavut Majchacheep
Southeast Asian Games medalists in shooting
Shooters at the 1998 Asian Games
Shooters at the 2002 Asian Games
Shooters at the 2006 Asian Games
Shooters at the 2010 Asian Games
Shooters at the 2014 Asian Games
Medalists at the 1998 Asian Games
Competitors at the 2007 Southeast Asian Games
Varavut Majchacheep
Varavut Majchacheep